Two vessels of the British Royal Navy have been named HMS Seabear:

  was an  launched at John Brown, Clydebank on 6 July 1918 and sold for scrap in February 1931.
  was an  launched at Redfern on 6 November 1943. The ship was originally to have been named  but was renamed in 1943. It arrived at Preston for breaking up on 12 December 1958.

References
 

Royal Navy ship names